Moonhead is the second full-length album by Thin White Rope, released in 1987.

Critical reception
Trouser Press wrote that the album "alters the modus operandi a bit, stretching song lengths and forging a provocative, embryonic bond between wiry, Television-styled guitar interplay and groove-conscious kraut-rock rhythms (held in place by Jozef Becker’s incredibly focused drumming)." The Los Angeles Times called the album "excellent," writing that the band's "fuzzy, often dissonant twin-guitar solos recall such diverse groups as Television and Spirit, as its material takes traditional forms and bends them into something unexpected, going from Western gallops to psychedelic dirges." 

The Guardian deemed "Crawl Piss Freeze" "not so much a song as an apocalyptic death march," while AllMusic described it as a postcard "from the edge." Spin wrote that the track creates "an unforgiving atmosphere of sparked vocals supplanted by an eardrum-piercing fretboard roar."

Track listing

Credits
 Guy Kyser – Guitar, Vocals
 Roger Kunkel – Guitar, Vocals
 Stephen Tesluk – Bass, Vocals
 John Von Feldt – Bass
 Jozef Becker – Drums
with
 Paul McKenna – Engineer, Producer
 John Golden – Mastering
 Ross Garfield – Drum Technician
and 
 Greg Gavin – Cover Painting, Paintings
 Merril Greene – Photography
 Robin K. – Photography
 Wendy Sherman – Design

References

1987 albums
Frontier Records albums
Thin White Rope albums